is a tokusatsu historical dark fantasy/science fiction epic film directed by Akio Jissoji, produced by "Exe" studios and distributed by Toho Studios.  It is the first cinematic adaptation of the award-winning historical fantasy novel Teito Monogatari by Hiroshi Aramata.  The film stars Kyūsaku Shimada, Shintaro Katsu, Kōji Takahashi, Jo Shishido, Junichi Ishida, Mieko Harada, Kō Nishimura, and Shirō Sano among others.  With a budget of around 1 billion yen (roughly $8 million), the movie was one of the most expensive live action Japanese special effects films to have been produced during that decade (by contrast, the internationally released 1984 film The Return of Godzilla was only budgeted at $6.25 million).

The movie went on to become a notable success in Japan.  It was one of the top ten highest grossing domestic motion pictures of 1988. It continues to be regarded in the country as a respected cult film.

Plot
The live-action film is an adaptation of the first 1/3rd of the original novel or the first four volumes (out of a total of 12).

The movie begins in 1912 with Yasumasa Hirai explaining to Baron Eiichi Shibusawa Tokyo's long history as one of the most haunted cities in all of Japan. He specifically warns Shibusawa that the vengeful spirit of Taira no Masakado, an ancient villain, must not be disturbed, as its spirit is powerful enough to destroy the city. In response to this heeding, Shibusawa allows the Tsuchimikado sect (土御門一門) to advise him on how to make Tokyo a blessed city. However, both Hirai's and Shibusawa's efforts are opposed by the oni Yasunori Kato, a former lieutenant in the Imperial Army, who wants to destroy Tokyo by awakening Masakado's spirit. To do this, he attempts to kidnap Yukari Tatsumiya, the descendant of Masakado, to use as a medium to communicate with the spirit. However, his plans are brought to attention to the Tsuchimikado by Koda Rohan. Hirai and his followers lock Yukari inside the Tsuchimikado temple and perform the monoimi (物忌) ceremony to defend her. Kato and his followers launch a frontal assault against the temple with shikigami. Kato escapes with Yukari and uses her as a medium, but Masakado rejects his offer. Ogai Mori diagnoses Yukari as pregnant with Kato's child. Emperor Meiji passes away, marking the end of the Meiji Era. In a dramatic display of devotion to the Meiji Emperor, Hirai commits seppuku.  His act divines the year of Tokyo's destruction; 1923, the Year of the Pig.

The narrative moves to 1923, Tokyo. Kato retreats to Dairen, and he and his followers use magic to cause artificial seismic waves under Dairen that echo through the Earth to Japan. Kato returns to Tokyo to awaken Masakado's spirit by himself, but is interrupted by Koda Rohan and Junichi Narutaki, who use the Chart of Eight Directions (八陣圖), a form of Kimon Tonko sorcery, in an attempt to trap him. Kato escapes, but fails to awaken Masakado. The seismic waves generated in Dairen reach Japan, and the Great Kanto Earthquake is stimulated.

The setting moves to 1927. Torahiko Terada has been appointed by Noritsugu Hayakawa as manager of the construction of Japan's first Tokyo Metro Ginza Line. Hayakawa's construction workers run into Kato's shikigami provoking Terada to seek out the aid of Dr. Makoto Nishimura to use his creation Gakutensoku to finish construction for them. Masakado summons Keiko Mekata, a miko, to defend his grave from Kato. Keiko joins forces with feng shui master Shigemaru Kuroda, who discovers the location of Kato's hideout. While Kuroda fights an Asura statue guarding the place, Keiko rushes to stop Kato, but Kato summons his gohō dōji to fend her off. Kato attempts to awaken Masakado through Yukari's child, Yukiko, but even this is unsuccessful. Keiko explains to Kato that Yukiko is not his child, but rather the result of an incestuous union between Yukari and her brother Yoichiro making her uncontrollable by Kato. Gakutensoku self-destructs, cutting off the spiritual energy veins connected to Kato's temple. Kato tries to use onmyodo magic one last time to stimulate an earthquake, but this is insufficient and he is severely wounded from the effort. Though his plans are foiled, Kato kidnaps Keiko and takes her with him to Manchuria. The film ends amidst another annual district wide festival celebrating the birth of the capital.  The Tatsumiya Family hopes for Keiko's return while Kyoka Izumi predicts Kato's return.

Cast
Shintaro Katsu as Eiichi Shibusawa: The famous industrialist who pioneered Western capitalism in Japan's economy.  In the story, he is head of the Tokyo Improvement Project, an ambitious enterprise calling upon the minds of specialists from a variety of fields, with the ultimate goal of making Tokyo the most powerful city in East Asia.
Kyūsaku Shimada as Yasunori Kato: An evil sorcerer wielding the power of several long dead mystics (such as Abe no Seimei) who wants to destroy Tokyo and cripple the Japanese Empire in order to fulfill a 2000-year-old curse.
Mieko Harada as Keiko Tatsumiya: A shrine maiden summoned by the spirit of Taira no Masakado to defend the Tatsumiya Family.
Junichi Ishida as Yoichiro Tatsumiya: An official in the Ministry of Finance.  He is the direct descendant of Taira no Masakado, the husband of Keiko Tatsumiya, the brother of Yukari Tatsumiya and the secret father of Yukiko Tatsumiya.
Shirō Sano as Junichi Narutaki: The close friend of Yoichiro Tatsumiya, he is in love with Yoichiro's sister, Yukari.  He participates in the defense of the city by fighting with the Tsuchimikado Clan against Kato as well as joining Koda Rohan in the defense of Masakado's grave.
Kōji Takahashi as Koda Rohan: The famous writer of the Meiji era whose work contributed to the reformation of modern Japanese literature  and who also was a renowned scholar of the supernatural.  Determined to stop Kato and protect Yukari, he joins the Tsuchimikado Clan as a student of the onmyoji.  After the death of Yasumasa Hirai, he spends several years mastering the secret mystical techniques for the purpose of defending Tokyo.  During the Year of the Boar, he attempts to halt Kato's advance to Masakado's grave.
Haruka Sugata as Yukari Tatsumiya: The sister of Yoichiro and also a direct descendant of Taira no Masakado and a psychic.  Due to her heritage and supernatural abilities, Kato abducts her and uses her as a medium to communicate with the spirit of Masakado.  She gives birth to Yukiko Tatsumiya, who is believed to be the result of Kato using his magic on her, but revealed later to be the consequence of a secret incestuous encounter between her and her brother.
Kō Nishimura as Makoto Nishimura: The renowned biologist who invented Japan's first functional robot, Gakutensoku.  In the story, he uses his creation to help finish the construction of Japan's first subway tunnel.  In the film, Makoto is portrayed by his real-life son, Kō Nishimura.
Ken Teraizumi as Torahiko Terada: The famous physicist and essayist renowned for his eccentric ideas, wide range of studies and considered the father of "nonlinear physics" in Japan.  At the Tokyo Improvement Project committee, he suggests the radical concept of creating an underground city as a backup plan in the event earthquakes should strike.  He is laughed off by the other members. Later however, Noritsugu Hayakawa hears of his reputation and appoints him as one of the heads of the construction of Japan's first subway system.
Mikijiro Hira as Yasumasa Hirai:  A master onmyoji who is leader of the Tsuchimikado Clan and the direct descendant of the legendary Abe no Seimei.  For the first part of the story, he serves as the primary foil to Yasunori Kato, having all his knowledge and understanding of his magics.  After the death of the Meiji Emperor, he performs a fatal act of divination to predict year of Tokyo's destruction.
Sanshi Katsura as Shigemaru Kuroda: A Feng Shui expert, who in investigating strange spiritual disturbances beneath Tokyo.  He serves as Keiko's assistant in the final battle against Kato.
Jo Shishido as Noritsugu Hayakawa:  The businessman who founded Japan's first underground railroad system.  During construction of the railway, his engineers run afoul of shikigami set by Kato.  Faced with this obstruction, Hayakawa must seek out aid to see his project go through to completion.
Katsuo Nakamura as Ogai Mori:  Legendary writer and surgeon in the Japanese army.  In the story, he performs an unsuccessful abortion on Yukari Tatsumiya after she has supposedly been impregnated with Kato's child.
Tamasaburo Bando V as Izumi Kyoka: Mysterious writer and fortune teller with cryptic information about Keiko's destiny.  Legendary Kabuki performer Bando V is a noted Izumi Kyoka scholar who has produced many plays based on his works.

Other cast members include Seiko Ito as Wajiro Kon, Hideji Ōtaki as Oda Kanno, Hisashi Igawa as Ryokichi Tagami and Ai Yasunaga as Azusa Nishimura. Hiroshi Aramata does a cameo as a brasserie client.

Production

The film began being produced around early 1987.  Swiss artist H. R. Giger was commissioned to design creatures for the movie.  Originally, he showed interest in working directly on set, however his schedule would not permit it.   His main contribution was the conceptual art for the gohō dōji.

The movie was also one of the first Japanese productions to employ Sony HDVS equipment for filming.  Approximately six minutes of the final movie was filmed using this technology.

The movie received a great deal of publicity with the media highlighting the grand recreation of circa 1927 Ginza district being made just for use in the film.  The open set, which cost around 300 million yen by itself, was a 150 meter long life sized facsimile of the early Showa era district featuring several electric cable cars  and 3000 fully costumed extras.

The production was plagued by many mysterious accidents, which some attributed to the influence of Taira no Masakado's real life spirit.  It is now common practice for Japanese filmmakers and TV crews to pay respect to the burial site of Masakado before bringing him to the screen.

Reception
When first released theatrically in Japan, the film became a commercial success and earned critical approval.  Peer Magazine, one of Japan's leading cinema publications, went so far as to praise the movie as the "best Japanese science fiction production of all time".  The movie had an annual revenue of 1.79 billion yen making it the third highest grossing Japanese produced film of that year, and the eighth highest-grossing film in Japan overall.

Despite success in its native country, Western reception of the subtitled version of the work has been mixed.  Anthony Romero of Toho Kingdom described the film as having “production values being noticeably high for a 1980's Japanese film” but “simply tries to cover far too much ground in too short a time”.  Japanese enthusiast website GenjiPress chided the film as "absolutely ridiculous from beginning to end" with a plot that was amazingly "confusing".

By contrast, Ian Shutter of the website videovista.net gave the film an 8/10 describing it as a "surreal yet always fascinating gothic urban nightmare" with "a blend of urban historical and fantasy horror centered on the great disaster of 1923, which plays like Capra meets Argento, with an oriental twist.".  Lee Broughton of the website DVD Savant rated the film as "Excellent", claiming it was "a highly original mystical epic" containing "great characters that we really come to care about and take an interest in as they weave in and out of each others lives.", and even compared its ambition to Terry Gilliam's Brazil.  French website DeVilDead.com however pointed out that the film's narrative, being incredibly dense and compressed, is simply "indigestable" for the average viewer, meaning the film could only be enjoyed as a supplement to the original novel and/or Doomed Megalopolis (an animated adaptation of the same section of the novel).  However the overall review was also positive, describing the production as "visually elegant" containing a "rich history", with Kyūsaku Shimada "incredible" in his role as Yasunori Kato.  The website Sarudama praised the movie calling it "incredibly ambitious and well-cast" with "superb" scenery and acting.  Author Patrick Macias in his book Tokyoscope also gave the movie a positive review, describing it as "overcooked", but "far from a bust".  Jim Harper in his book Flowers from Hell: The Modern Japanese Horror Film concedes that, had it not been for some pacing problems and a "ponderous plot", the movie could have been a "bona fide cult classic".

In the 2015 Blu-ray commentary of the movie, the filmmakers compared the film's cult stature to David Lynch's 1984 film adaptation of Frank Herbert's Dune.  They concluded that like the aforementioned movie Tokyo: The Last Megalopolis was an ambitious, visually lush, large budget adaptation of a dense science fiction work which heavily compressed the source material's narrative to accommodate a 2-hour time slot.

Accolades
Wins
 18th Takasaki Film Festival: Award for Best Newcomer; Kyūsaku Shimada, 1988

Nominations
 Japanese Academy Awards: Award of the Japanese Academy, Best Editing, Keiichi Uraoka; Best Art Direction, Takeo Kimura, Noriyoshi Ikeya; 1989

Legacy
The movie was the first motion picture to visually illustrate Chinese and Japanese folklore tropes such as shikigami, kodoku magic, gohō dōji and Kimon Tonkou magic in Japanese cinema.  The movie's box office success paved the way for a film franchise consisting of a direct sequel, an OVA remake; two direct to video spinoff titles Teito Monogatari Gaiden (1995), Sim-Feng Shui (1997), and a theatrical spinoff The Great Yokai War (2005).

The movie was the first major successful project for Takashige Ichise, the producer who would go on to be responsible for the contemporary J-Horror boom by financing such franchises as the Ring and Ju-On series.  It was also the most financially successful production for director Akio Jissoji, best known in the West for his work on the classic tokusatsu series Ultraman.

Kyūsaku Shimada's performance as Yasunori Kato, the primary antagonist of the film, was extremely popular with audiences and is generally considered the most popular representation of the character.  Hiroshi Aramata himself even rewrote physical descriptions of Kato in the novel's various republications to more closely match Shimada's image.  In turn, Shimada's portrayal of Yasunori Kato is frequently homaged in Japanese popular culture.  For example, the fictional characters Washizaki from the  manga/anime Riki-Oh and M. Bison/Vega of the Street Fighter video game series are widely regarded as homages to Shimada's version of Kato. The character has a cameo appearance in the opening chapters of CLAMP's Tokyo Babylon manga.  Other examples include parodies in TV animation, such as the shows Haunted Junction and Brave Police J-Decker; manga such as Nura: Rise of the Yokai Clan and video games such as Shin Megami Tensei: Devil Summoner: Raidou Kuzunoha vs. The Soulless Army.

Independent film director Go Shibata has cited Tokyo: The Last Megalopolis as an influence in his work, such as his 2009 film Doman Seman.

Home Releases
In Japan, the film is available on VHS, DVD and Blu-ray.  In 1995, Manga Live released a VHS edition of the film in the UK which was edited, as well as dubbed.  In 1998, ADV Films released a subtitled VHS copy of the film in the North American market.  In 2003, ADV Films released a subtitled DVD edition of the film to the North American market.

The film and its sequel were both released in Japan on Blu-ray on August 8, 2015 in a Special Edition package featuring new cover designs by SPFX artist Shinji Higuchi (who worked on the film).

See also
Onmyoji (2001):  An equally successful historical fantasy film dealing with some of the same subject matter.  The novels the respective films were based on were released only a few years apart and thus are considered part of the same "boom".

References

Sources

External links

 
 

1980s science fiction films
1988 films
ADV Films
Japanese epic films
Japanese fantasy adventure films
Films based on Japanese novels
Films directed by Akio Jissoji
1980s Japanese-language films
Toho films
Tokusatsu films
1988 fantasy films
1980s Japanese films